The 2011 Sam Houston State Bearkats football team represented Sam Houston State University in the 2011 NCAA Division I FCS football season. The Bearkats were  led by second year head coach Willie Fritz and played their home games at Bowers Stadium. They are a member of the Southland Conference. They finished the season 14–1, 7–0 in Southland play to win the conference championship. They received the conference's automatic bid into the FCS Playoffs where they advanced to the National Championship Game before falling to North Dakota State 6–17.

Schedule

References

Sam Houston State
Sam Houston Bearkats football seasons
Southland Conference football champion seasons
Sam Houston State
Sam Houston State Bearkats football